The following is a list of FCC-licensed radio stations in the U.S. state of Connecticut, which can be sorted by their call signs, frequencies, cities of license, licensees, and programming formats.

List of radio stations

Defunct 
 WAAQ
 WAOF
 WBIB-FM (1947–1954)
 WBRL
 WBVC
 WBZY (1947–1964)
 WCAC
 WCFV-LP 
 WCJ
 WCON
 WCSE-LP
 WCWS
 WDAK (1922–1924)
 WDJZ (1977–2016)
 WELI-FM
 WFHA
 WGCH-FM
 WHNM
 WICT-LP
 WKAX
 WKKA
 WKKK (unaired)
 WKNB-FM
 WLAC
 WLCR
 WLIZ
 WLNV
 WMDX-LP
 WNLC
 WNLN-LP 
 WOAS
 WOGS-LP
 WQAD
 WQQW
 WQSA-LP
 WSAG
 WSCH-FM
 WSPV-LP
 WTHT (1936–1954)
 WTHT-FM (1948–1950)
 WWBW-LP
 WWEB
 WXRN
 WYBC 640 AM
 WYPH-LP
 WZMA-LP

References 

 
Connecticut
Radio stations